The 407th Air Refueling Squadron is an inactive United States Air Force unit.  It was last assigned to the 42nd Bombardment Wing at Loring Air Force Base, Maine, where it was inactivated on 1 October 1990.  

The first predecessor of the squadron was activated as the 17th Reconnaissance Squadron in  March 1942.  It was redesignated the 407th Bombardment Squadron the following month.  After participating in the antisubmarine campaign while training, it moved to the United Kingdom in August 1942, where it became a training unit for heavy bombers.  From May 1943, it participated in the strategic bombing campaign against Germany.  It earned two Distinguished Unit Citation for its actions.  After V-E Day, it moved to France, performing airlift missions until it was inactivated in 1946.

The squadron's second predecessor, the 407th Air Refueling Squadron, was activated in 1953 and supported Strategic Air Command's (SAC) fighters until they were transferred to Tactical Air Command, then primarily SAC bomber units until inactivating in 1961.  It was activated again in 1962 with jet tankers.  The squadron deployed aircrews and aircraft to support the war in Southeast Asia from the late 1960s until 1975. The two units were consolidated in 1985.

History

World War II

Initial organization and training
The squadron's first predecessor was activated at Barksdale Field, Louisiana on 1 March 1942, as the 17th Reconnaissance Squadron, one of the four original squadrons of the 92nd Bombardment Group.  Manned like the three bombardment squadrons of the group, it was designated for the long range reconnaissance mission.   Since a reorganization of General Headquarters Air Force in September 1936, each bombardment group of the Army Air Forces (AAF) had an assigned or attached reconnaissance squadron, which operated the same aircraft as that group's assigned bombardment squadrons.  That arrangement continued for units that were designated as heavy units.  

Later that month it moved to MacDill Field, Florida and trained with Boeing B-17 Flying Fortresses. While training in Florida, the squadron also flew antisubmarine patrols off the Florida coast. While at MacDill, its distinction from the group's other squadrons ended, and in April, it became the 407th Bombardment Squadron. The air echelon departed Sarasota Army Air Field for Westover Field, Massachusetts on 19 June 1942, flying on to Dow Field, Maine on 29 June. The squadron then ferried their B-17s across the North Atlantic via Newfoundland starting between 12 and 15 August. They flew directly from Newfoundland to Prestwick Airport, Scotland. The 92nd Group was the first to fly their bombers non-stop across the Atlantic. The 407th was the last of the group's squadrons to complete the move, with its last plane arriving at RAF Bovingdon on 28 August. Meanwhile,  the ground echelon left Bradenton on 18 July, arriving at Fort Dix, New Jersey in the New York Port of Embarkation two days later.

Operations in the European Theater

The buildup of Eighth Air Force in England required the establishment of a combat crew replacement and training center, but a lack of qualified personnel and aircraft hampered its development.  As a result, the decision was made to use the 92nd Group and its squadrons as a temporary crew training unit, acting as the main component of what became the 11th Combat Crew Replacement Center Group.  However, the 92d was the first group to arrive in Engand with improved B-17Fs, and with the training mission came an exchange of these newer models for the older B-17Es of the 97th Bombardment Group to use in training.  On 6 September, to provide the squadron with combat experience, it flew its first combat mission against the Potez aircraft factory at Meaulte, France.  Although remaining a replacement crew training unit until May 1943, the squadron initially flew occasional combat missions.  In January 1943, he squadron moved to RAF Alconbury.

In May 1943, the squadron's training mission was transferred and the 407th began flying combat missions.   Through May 1944 its targets included shipyards at Kiel, ball bearing plants at Schweinfurt, submarine pens at Wilhelmshaven, a tire manufacturing plant at Hannover, airfields near Paris, an aircraft factory at Nantes and a magnesium mine in Norway.

The squadron earned a Distinguished Unit Citation on 11 January 1944, when it successfully bombed aircraft manufacturing factories in Oschersleben, Germany despite adverse weather, a lack of fighter protection and heavy flak.  It participated in Big Week, the intensive attack against German aircraft industry in late February 1944.  It took part in Operation Crossbow, attacks on launch sites for V-1 flying bombs and V-2 rockets.  It struck airfields and industrial sites in France, Belgium, the Netherlands, and Germany.  After October 1944 it concentrated on transportation and oil industry targets.  On 11 September, it earned a second DUC for a mission against petroleum facilities at Merseburg. 

In addition to its strategic bombing mission, the squadron flew interdiction and air support missions.  During Operation Overlord, the Normandy invasion, it attacked coastal defenses, transportation junctions and marshalling yards near the beachhead. It provided air support for Operation Cobra, the Allied breakout at Saint Lo, It bombed bridges and gun positions to support Operation Market Garden, the airborne attacks in the Netherlands near Arnhem, to secure bridgeheads across the Rhine in September.  During the Battle of the Bulge, from December 1944 to January 1945, it attacked bridges and marshalling yards near the target area.  During Operation Varsity, the airborne assault across the Rhine, it provided cover by bombing airfields near the drop zone.  It flew its last combat mission on 25 April 1945, when the 92nd Group led the entire Eighth Air Force formation in an attack on Plzeň.

Following V-E Day, the squadron moved to Istres Air Base, France, where it participated in the Green Project, transporting troops returning to the United States, flying them to Cazes Field in Morocco until September, returning French servicemen to France on return trips.  During the winter it flew displaced Greek nationals from Munich to Athens.  It was inactivated in France on 28 February 1946 and its remaining personnel were absorbed into elements of the 306th Bombardment Group at Lechfeld Air Base, Germany.

Air refueling operations

Piston engine tanker operations

The second predecessor of the squadron was activated as the 407th Air Refueling Squadron at Great Falls Air Force Base, Montana in December 1953 as an element of the 407th Strategic Fighter Wing, as the 407th Wing prepared for the transfer of Great Falls to Strategic Air Command (SAC) from Military Air Transport Service.  Wing elements were not fully manned and it was June 1954 before the wing's flying units became fully operational.  The squadron was equipped with Boeing KB-29 Superfortress tankers to refuel the 407th Wing's Republic F-84F Thunderstreak escort fighters. It participated in exercises and deployed crews and aircraft to various parts of the world.  From August to November 1954, it deployed with the 407th Wing to Misawa Air Base, Japan to provide air defense of northern Japan.

In 1957, SAC's strategic fighter wings were inactivated or transferred tp Tactical Air Command (TAC)  The 407th Wing inactivated on 1 July, and SAC formed the 4061st Air Refueling Wing to run Malmstrom (as Great Falls was now called) and command the 407th and 97th Air Refueling Squadrons there.  The squadron mission now focused on refueling strategic bombers, and it converted to Boeing KC-97 Stratofreighters, continuing exercise support for SAC and deployments, including to Anderson Air Force Base, Guam, Elmendorf Air Force Base, Alaska  and Royal Canadian Air Force bases in Canada. Deployments included Reflex operations, which placed KC-97s and Boeing B-47 Stratojets at overseas bases closer to the Soviet Union for 90 day periods, although individuals rotated back to home bases during unit Reflex deployments   The percentage of SAC planes on alert gradually grew over the next three years to reach its goal of one third of SAC’s force on alert by 1960. Malmstrom was becoming a missile base with early model Minuteman missiles.  Plans were made to transfer the squadron to Ellsworth Air Force Base, South Dakota, but they were cancelled and the squadron and its parent wing were inactivated on 15 July 1961.

KC-135 operations
The 19th Bombardment Wing at Homestead Air Force Base, Florida had transferred its B-47s in late 1961 and was converting to the Boeing B-52 Stratofortress, starting to receive its new bombers in 1962.  On 1 April 1962, the squadron was organized with Boeing KC-135 Stratotankers as the wing's refueling unit.  In addition to exercise participation, and support for the 19th Wing's bombers, the squadron provided air refueling support for aircraft from other commands.  Soon after detection of Soviet missiles in Cuba, SAC withdrew its forces from Homestead Air Force Base as the base became saturated with tactical forces.  In what was called Operation Riders Up, with the exception of planes already on alert, the squadron's planes left Florida by 21 October.  Alert planes left Homestead by 22 October. Additional KC-135 were placed on alert to replace KC-135s devoted to maintaining 1/8 of the B-52 bomber force on airborne alert. On 24 October SAC went to DEFCON 2, placing all aircraft on alert. Forward deployed tanker task forces were also augmented.  On 27 November SAC returned to normal alert posture and began coordinating the return of its Florida planes to their home bases.

The squadron supported the airborne bomber force flying Operation Chrome Dome or "airborne alert training".  The squadron supported bombers flying these missions and also maintained a ground alert commitment, that had  increased to half the squadron's aircraft in 1962.  Accidents at Palomares, Spain in January 1966 and near Thule in January 1968 contributed to the end of Chrome Dome, as did rapidly rising costs of the programs and the use of strategic bombers for non-nuclear missions in Southeast Asia, but the primary reason was the availability of a survivable intercontinental ballistic missile force.

In July 1968, SAC transferred Homestead to TAC.  The 19th Wing moved to Robins Air Force Base, Georgia, replacing the 465th Bombardment Wing there, and absorbing its 912th Air Refueling Squadron.  The 407th did not move with the wing, instead, it moved to Loring Air Force Base, Maine, where it became the second refueling squadron of the 42nd Bombardment Wing.

In addition to its alert and exercise commitments at Loring, the squadron provided crews and aircraft to SAC organizations flying combat operations in Southeast Asia. This support continued until 1975, after which the squadron resumed its alert, deployment, and exercise commitments.  The two 407th squadrons were consolidated on 19 September 1985.  The consolidated unit was inactivated in October 1990.

Lineage
 407th Bombardment Squadron
 Constituted as the 17th Reconnaissance Squadron (Heavy) on 28 January 1942
 Activated on 1 March 1942
 Redesignated 407th Bombardment Squadron (Heavy) on 22 April 1942
 Redesignated 407th Bombardment Squadron, Heavy on 27 September 1944
 Inactivated on 28 February 1946
 Consolidated with the 407th Air Refueling Squadron as the 407th Air Refueling Squadron on 15 September 1985

 407th Air Refueling Squadron
 Constituted as the 407th Air Refueling Squadron, Strategic Fighter on 13 November 1953
 Activated on 18 December 1953
 Redesignated 407th Air Refueling Squadron, Medium on 15 September 1958
 Discontinued and inactivated on 15 July 1961
 Redesignated 407th Air Refueling Squadron, Heavy and activated, on 26 January 1962 (not organized)
 Organized on 1 April 1962
 Consolidated with the 407th Bombardment Squadron on 15 September 1985
 Inactivated on 1 October 1990

Assignments
 92nd Bombardment Group, 1 March 1942 – 28 February 1946
 407th Strategic Fighter Wing, 18 December 1953
 4061st Air Refueling Wing, 1 July 1957 – 15 July 1961
 Strategic Air Command, 26 January 1962 (not organized)
 19th Bombardment Wing, 1 April 1962
 42nd Bombardment Wing, 2 July 1968 – 1 October 1990

Stations

 Barksdale Field, Louisiana, 1 March 1942
 MacDill Field, Florida, 26 March 1942
 Sarasota Army Air Field, Florida, 18 May – 18 July 1942
 RAF Bovingdon (AAF-112), England, 18 August 1942
 RAF Alconbury (AAF-102), England, 6 January 1943
 RAF Podington (AAF-109), England, 15 September 1943
 Istres Air Base (Y-17), France, c. May 1945 – 28 February 1946
 Great Falls Air Force Base (later Malmstrom Air Force Base), Montana, 18 December 1953 – 15 July 1961
 Homestead Air Force Base, Florida, 1 April 1962
 Loring Air Force Base, Maine, 2 July 1968 – 1 October 1990

Aircraft

 Boeing B-17 Flying Fortress, 1942–1946
 Boeing KB-29 Superfortress, 1953–1957
 Boeing KC-97 Stratofreighter, 1957–1961
 Boeing KC-135 Stratotanker, 1962–1990

Awards and campaigns

See also
 B-17 Flying Fortress units of the United States Army Air Forces
 List of United States Air Force air refueling squadrons

References

Notes
 Explanatory notes

 Citations

Bibliography

 
 
 
 
 
 
 
 
 
 
 
 

Air refueling squadrons of the United States Air Force
Military units and formations established in 1953
Units and formations of Strategic Air Command